Sugar High may refer to:

 Sugar high, a misconception that sugar can cause hyperactivity 
 Sugar High (album), a 2002 album by Chihiro Onitsuka
 "Sugar High", a 2001 song by Jade Anderson
 Sugar High, a 2011 TV series on the Food Network hosted by Duff Goldman
 Sugar High (film), a 2020 baking competition special